James Priest may refer to:

 James Percy Priest (1900–1956), American teacher, journalist and politician
 James M. Priest (1819–1883), Vice President of Liberia

See also
 James DePreist (1936–2013), American conductor